Miles Tice Mikolas (born August 23, 1988), nicknamed "Lizard King", is an American professional baseball pitcher for the St. Louis Cardinals of Major League Baseball (MLB). He previously played in MLB for the San Diego Padres and Texas Rangers, as well as the Yomiuri Giants of Nippon Professional Baseball (NPB). He was an All-Star in 2018, led the National League in wins that season, and finished sixth in NL Cy Young Award voting that year. He was also an All-Star in 2022.

Amateur career
Mikolas pitched for Jupiter Community High School in Palm Beach County, Florida, from which he graduated in 2006. He then attended Nova Southeastern University and played college baseball for the Nova Southeastern Sharks. In 2009, his junior year, he went 7–2 with a 2.06 ERA in 11 starts.

Professional career

San Diego Padres
The San Diego Padres selected Mikolas in the seventh round of the 2009 Major League Baseball draft.

Mikolas pitched as a reliever for the Class-A Fort Wayne TinCaps in 2010, and was 6–3 with 13 saves (2nd in the Midwest League) and posted a 2.20 earned run average (ERA) in 60 games (leading the league). He was named a Midwest League All Star.

He began 2011 with the High-A Lake Elsinore Storm and, after going 3–0 with 12 saves (4th in the California League) and a 1.13 ERA in 34 games, was promoted to the Double-A San Antonio Missions on July 4. Mikolas finished out 2011 by going 1–0 with nine saves and compiling a 1.67 ERA as a reliever for the Missions over 28 games.

Mikolas received a non-roster invitation to spring training in 2012. He was assigned to the minor league camp later in the spring, and started the year with San Antonio. Mikolas was called up to the majors for the first time directly from Double-A San Antonio on May 5, 2012. He made his debut at Petco Park against the Miami Marlins, for whom he grew up rooting. The first batter he faced, Giancarlo Stanton, hit a home run. Mikolas was sent down to the Triple-A Tucson Padres on June 5, after making 13 appearances and allowing five earned runs in 13 innings. He was recalled on July 5, and made two more appearances before being optioned back to Triple-A. He was recalled from Tucson again on August 5, and stayed with the big league club through the rest of the year. For the season, Mikolas was 2–1 and amassed a 3.62 ERA and 23 strikeouts versus 15 walks over 32 innings.

In 2013 with Tucson, he was 4–2 with a 3.25 ERA, and 26 saves (3rd in the Pacific Coast League). He pitched  scoreless innings for the Padres. Mikolas was designated for assignment by the Padres on November 20, 2013.

Texas Rangers

The Padres traded Mikolas to the Pittsburgh Pirates, along with Jaff Decker, for Alex Dickerson after the 2013 season. During that offseason, the Pirates traded him to the Texas Rangers in exchange for Chris McGuiness. He began the 2014 season with the Round Rock Express.

Mikolas was called up to the Rangers' 25-man roster on July 1, 2014. In  innings pitched prior to his promotion, he had a 5–1 win–loss record with a 3.22 ERA. Mikolas started his first career game against the Baltimore Orioles, giving up three hits and three runs in  innings. He spent the remainder of the season with Texas, going 2–5 with a 6.44 ERA in ten starts. The Rangers released Mikolas after the 2014 season.

Yomiuri Giants

On November 25, 2014, Mikolas signed a one-year,  deal with the Yomiuri Giants of Nippon Professional Baseball for the 2015 season. In 2015, he was 13–3. After the season, the Giants re-signed him to a two-year deal. In three seasons for Yomiuri, he pitched to a 31–13 record with a 2.18 ERA in 62 starts.

St. Louis Cardinals
Mikolas signed a two-year, $15.5 million contract with the St. Louis Cardinals on December 5, 2017. He won his debut with the Cardinals 8–4 on April 2, 2018, at Miller Park against the Milwaukee Brewers. While batting, he hit a two-run home run versus Zach Davies for his first major league hit. On the mound, he completed  innings, allowing three home runs and four runs total, while striking out five and walking none.

Mikolas threw his first major league complete game, a shutout, on May 21, 2018, at Busch Stadium against the Kansas City Royals. He struck out nine, walked one, and gave up only four hits as the Cardinals defeated Kansas City 6–0. Owning a 9–3 record, a 2.63 ERA, and a 1.03 WHIP, Mikolas was named to the 2018 Major League Baseball All-Star Game, his first All-Star selection.

Mikolas finished his 2018 campaign with an 18–4 record (including a 10–0 record on the road), a league-leading .818 won-loss percentage, a 2.83 ERA (4th in the National League), 1.071 WHIP (5th), walking just 29 batters in  innings (6th), in 32 starts (9th). His 18 wins tied with Jon Lester and Max Scherzer for the NL lead. He led the majors with only 1.30 BB/9, and also led all major league pitchers in first-strike percentage (70.8%). In addition, he had the highest zone percentage of all major league pitchers, with 48.0% of his pitches being in the strike zone. On defense, he was second among NL pitchers in range factor per 9 innings (2.20), third in putouts (19), and fourth in assists (30). He came in sixth in the voting for the 2018 NL Cy Young Award.

On February 26, 2019, Mikolas and the Cardinals agreed on a four-year extension worth $68 million. He finished the 2019 regular season with a 9–14 record and a 4.16 ERA, striking out 144 over 184 innings. He was named St. Louis' Game 1 starter for the 2019 National League Division Series. He missed the entire 2020 season due to undergoing surgery to repair a flexor tendon in his right arm.

On August 20, 2021, Mikolas was activated off of the 60-day injured list after missing the past 75 games with a right forearm strain.

Mikolas threw  no-hit innings in a game on June 14, 2022, against the Pittsburgh Pirates. With two strikes in the count to the next batter, Cal Mitchell, Mikolas allowed a ground-rule double.

Mikolas was named to the 2022 Major League Baseball All-Star Game after replacing Corbin Burnes.

Personal life
Mikolas is married to Lauren Mikolas, who was an elementary school teacher, UFC ring girl, and certified wellness coach who became a social media celebrity in Japan with her lifestyle blog. Their first child, a daughter, was born in March 2017, and his wife gave birth to twins, a son and a daughter, in July 2018.

Mikolas got the nickname "Lizard King" when, on a bet, he ate a lizard in the bullpen during a 2011 Arizona Fall League game. The video was posted to YouTube.

See also

 List of Nova Southeastern University alumni
 St. Louis Cardinals award winners and league leaders

References

External links

1988 births
Living people
American expatriate baseball players in Japan
Baseball players from Florida
Eugene Emeralds players
Fort Wayne TinCaps players
Lake Elsinore Storm players
Major League Baseball pitchers
National League All-Stars
National League wins champions
Nippon Professional Baseball pitchers
Nova Southeastern Sharks baseball players
People from Jupiter, Florida
San Antonio Missions players
San Diego Padres players
St. Louis Cardinals players
Texas Rangers players
Tucson Padres players
Yomiuri Giants players
2023 World Baseball Classic players